was a Japanese daimyō of the mid-Edo period, who ruled the Wakayama Domain. He was the son of Tokugawa Munenao, grandson of Matsudaira Yorizumi and great-grandson of Kishū Domain founder, Tokugawa Yorinobu. His childhood name was Naomatsu (直松).

Family
 Father: Tokugawa Munenao (1682–1757)
 Mother: Hattori-dono later Eiryu'in
 Wives: 
 Tokuko, daughter of Imadegawa Kinakira
 Takako, daughter of Ichijō Kaneka
 Concubines:
 Yoshida-dono
 Maeda-dono
 Murakami-dono
 Ueda-dono
 Children:
 Naomatsu by Tokuko
 Senmanhime married Maeda Shigemichi by Tokuko
 Kotohime betrothed to Ikeda Shigenobu by Tokuko
 Mon'noshin by Tokuko
 Matsudaira Yoriyuki by Tokuko
 Ishihime by Tokuko
 Matsudaira Tadakatsu of Kuwana Domain by Tokuko
 Tokugawa Shigenori (1746–1829) by Yoshida
 Ichihime married Matsudaira Shigetomi by Yoshida
 Naito Satofumi (1751–1794) of Koromo Domain by Yoshida
 Matsudaira Yorikata (1755–1806) of Saijo Domain by Maeda
 Yorihime married Tokugawa Haruyuki by Murakami
 Miura Tamenobu (1759–1789) by Murakami
 Ando Michinori (1760–1825) by Murakami
 Abe Masayoshi by Murakami
 Matsudaira Tadatomo (1759–1802) of Kuwana Domain by Ueda

References

 Wakayama Domain on "300 han HTML"

1720 births
1765 deaths
Kishū-Tokugawa clan
Shinpan daimyo